Nobody's Wife may refer to:

Film
 Nobody's Wife (1918 film), American film directed by Edward LeSaint
 Nobody's Wife (1937 film), Mexican film
 Nobody's Wife (1950 film), Spanish film

Music
 "Nobody's Wife", a 1997 single by Dutch singer Anouk